Larry Cameron (November 4, 1952 – December 13, 1993) was an American professional football player and wrestler.

Football career

Larry Cameron was born and raised in Natchez, MS. When he was a teenager, he played football in high school and college. He was drafted in the NFL in 1973 by the Denver Broncos and later by the Canadian Football League, where he played with the BC Lions and Ottawa Rough Riders. In 1975 and 1976 he was an all-star and won the Grey Cup with Ottawa. His football career would be cut short due to injuries.

Wrestling career
After his football career ended, Cameron  became Mr. Minnesota and Northern States Bodybuilding champion before he got discovered by Ed Sharkey and wrestled  in his Promotion AWA. Later he also went up to Calgary to train with Stu Hart in the Dungeon, where he trained alongside another former NFL and CFL star, former Cincinnati Bengals, Buffalo Bills, and Calgary Stampeders nosetackle Brian Pillman. Cameron made his wrestling debut with Stampede Wrestling in 1985, where he would wrestle as "Lethal" Larry Cameron. He was a straight up powerhouse with a bad attitude. He would also wrestle in various promotions in the United States. He won his first championship in September 1987, when he won Pro Wrestling America's Heavyweight Championship, defeating Ricky Rice.

In 1988, he had wrestled handful of shows for the National Wrestling Alliance and the American Wrestling Association. In April 1989, he defeated Davey Boy Smith to win the Stampede North American Heavyweight Championship. He would hold on to the title, until the promotion closed in December 1989. After Stampede shut down, he would return to the AWA in 1990. He would also wrestle for New Japan Pro-Wrestling. That same year he worked for World Championship Wrestling, where he was managed by Teddy Long. Cameron and Butch Reed feuded with Ric Flair and Arn Anderson in December 1990. 

After the AWA shut down and a tryout with the World Wrestling Federation, he went on a tour of Austria, where he caught the eye of Otto Wanz. Wanz offered Cameron to work for his promotion, Catch Wrestling Association. And in September 1991, Cameron began touring with the CWA. He would return to NJPW for a month in April 1992. In July 1992, he won the CWA World Tag Team Championship with his partner Mad Bull Buster. The two would hold the titles for 53 weeks, before losing them to Dave Taylor and Mile Zrno. In April 1993, he wrestled one show in the United States for an NWA territory in Minnesota. That October, he and Mad Bull Buster regained the CWA Tag Team titles and held them, until the unfortunate accident.

Death
On December 13, 1993, during his match with Tony St. Clair in Bremen, Germany, Cameron suffered a heart attack.   He was 41 years old.

As a result of Cameron's death, Mad Bull Buster had to vacate the CWA World Tag Team Championship, on behalf of himself and his late partner.

Championships and accomplishments
Catch Wrestling Association
CWA World Tag Team Championship (2 times) with Mad Bull Buster
International Wrestling Association
IWA Heavyweight Championship (1 time)
Pro Wrestling America
PWA Heavyweight Championship (1 time)
Pro Wrestling Illustrated
PWI ranked him #103 of the 500 best singles wrestlers of the year in the PWI 500 in 1991
PWI ranked him #327 of the Top 500 Singles Wrestlers of the "PWI Years" in 2003 
Stampede Wrestling
Stampede North American Heavyweight Championship (1 time)
Stampede Wrestling Hall of Fame (Class of 1995)

See also
 List of premature professional wrestling deaths

References

External links
Online World of Wrestling Profile
Cagematch Profile
Genickbruch Profile

1952 births
1993 deaths
American male professional wrestlers
BC Lions players
Canadian Football League Rookie of the Year Award winners
Ottawa Rough Riders players
Players of American football from Chicago
Professional wrestling deaths
Sport deaths in Germany
Sportspeople from Chicago
20th-century American male actors
Stampede Wrestling alumni
20th-century professional wrestlers
Stampede Wrestling North American Heavyweight Champions